Lockwood Masters "Woody" Pirie (April 25, 1904 – May 4, 1965) was an American competitive sailor and Olympic medalist. He won a bronze medal in the Swallow class at the 1948 Summer Olympics in London, together with Owen Torrey.

Biography
He was born on April 25, 1904. He died on May 4, 1965 in Miami, Florida.

References

1904 births
1965 deaths
American male sailors (sport)
Olympic bronze medalists for the United States in sailing
Medalists at the 1948 Summer Olympics
Sailors at the 1948 Summer Olympics – Swallow
Star class world champions
World champions in sailing for the United States